Chaetodon mesoleucos, the white-faced butterflyfish, is a species off marine ray-finned fish, a butterflyfish, belonging to the family Chaetodontidae. It is found in the north western Indian Ocean.

Description
Chaetodon mesoleucos has a bluish white anterior part of the body with a vertical black band running through the eye. The rest of the body is pale grey in colour marked with numerous vertical black lines. The caudal fin is black with a white on the inner margin near the caudal peduncle.

Distribution
Chaetodon mesoleucos is found in the northwestern Indian Ocean. It occurs from the central Red Sea, into the Gulf of Aden and around Socotra.

Habitat and biology
They are thought to feed mainly on coral polyps but will eat a variety of benthic invertebrates. Little is known about the biology of this species.

Systematics
Chaetodon mesoleucos was first formally described in 1775 by the Swedish-speaking Finnish explorer, orientalist, naturalist Peter Forsskål (1732-1763), his description was published in 1775 by his companion on his expedition to Yemen, the orientalist and mathematician Carsten Niebuhr. The type locality was given as Al-Mukhā in Yemen. It belongs to the large subgenus Rabdophorus which might warrant recognition as a distinct genus.

Utilsation
Chaetodon mesoleucos is uncommon in the aquarium trade. However, it is not a difficult species to keep in captivity.

References

mesoleucos
Fish described in 1775
Taxa named by Peter Forsskål